was a Japanese physician specializing in medical jurisprudence. His books were so popular that they became best-sellers in Japan.

Biography
Nishimaru was born in Yokohama. He studied medicine at Yokohama Medical College (present-day Yokohama City University School of Medicine), and was appointed Professor of medical jurisprudence there in 1973. While working at Yokohama City University, he wrote some enlightening essays on forensic medicine, including Afternoon in the Forensic Medicine Classroom which was made into a TV program in Japan. After retiring from Yokohama City University and becoming Professor Emeritus, he became a ship's doctor.

Works

References

1927 births
2020 deaths
20th-century Japanese physicians
Medical ethicists
Japanese essayists
Academic staff of Yokohama City University
Yokohama City University alumni
People from Yokohama